The White Brotherhood was an urban society (or militia) of Toulouse established in 1211 during the episcopate of Folquet de Marselha, so-called from its members' habit of wearing white crosses on their chests. The society, called a "pious institution" by William of Puylaurens, was militant towards usurers (Jews) and Cathars, robbing them and destroying their homes. Most of the Whites came from the city proper. A Black Brotherhood, so-called in opposition to the White, was soon formed and the two factions went to war in the streets of Toulouse. According to Puylaurens:
Daily the two parties would clash, banners flying, bristling with weapons, even with cavalry in evidence. Through the agency of His servant the bishop, Our Lord came to bring them, not a bad peace but a good war. 
From the White Brotherhood Folquet selected 500 men-at-arms and sent them to aid the Albigensian Crusade in besieging Lavaur. The bishop even composed pro-Crusade sirventes for the troops to sing. Count Raymond VII, however, forbade the citizens to go and tried to force Folquet from the city. The White Brotherhood did go, however, and the bishop eventually left as well, to join the siege at Lavaur.

The White Brotherhood gained notoriety among the opponents of the Crusade. The troubadour Gavaudan wrote the song A la plus longa nuech de l'an in which he criticises the "foolish white people", almost certainly a reference to the Whites of Toulouse.

Sources

Kastner, Leo E. "Gavaudan's Crusade Song. (Bartsch, Grundriss, 174, 10)." The Modern Language Review, 26:2 (Apr., 1931), pp. 142–150. 
Oldenbourg, Zoe. Massacre at Montsegur: A History of the Albigensian Crusade. Sterling Publishing Company, 2006. .

Notes

History of Toulouse
1211 establishments in Europe
1210s establishments in France
Albigensian Crusade
Antisemitism in France